A provincial by-election was held in Quebec on 24 September 2007 to fill the vacancy in the National Assembly riding of Charlevoix.

The by-election was caused by the decision of PQ MNA Rosaire Bertrand to stand down to offer the new Parti Québécois leader Pauline Marois a way to become an MNA. The Liberal Party of Quebec stated that it would not stand a candidate against Marois so that all three party leaders would be represented in the National Assembly, but the Action démocratique du Québec did run a candidate. The ADQ accused the Liberals and the PQ of a lack of democratic principles, claiming that it was not necessary for a third-party leader to be represented in the National Assembly.

Results

|-

|Independent (F4J)
|Daniel Laforest
|align="right"|64
|align="right"|0.33
|align="right"|+0.33
|-

|Parti république
|François Robert Lemire
|align="right"|52
|align="right"|0.27
|align="right"|+0.27
|}

References

2007 elections in Canada
2007 in Quebec

Provincial by-elections in Quebec